Fidelity Emerging Markets Ltd is a large Guernsey-incorporated, London-based closed-end investment fund focused predominantly on holdings in the stock markets of emerging economies. Established in July 1989, the company is a constituent of the FTSE 250 Index. Its chairman is Coen Teulings. The company changed its name from Genesis Emerging Markets Fund to Fidelity Emerging Markets on 1 October 2021.

References

External links 
 

Financial services companies established in 1989
Investment management companies of the United Kingdom